Navid Rahman (born 26 May 1996) is a professional footballer who plays for Blue Devils FC in League1 Ontario and the Pakistan national team.

Club career
In 2016–17, Rahman played in League1 Ontario for ProStars FC, making a total of 19 appearances and scoring two goals.

In the summer of 2017, Rahman signed with Slovakian 2. Liga club Komárno alongside his brother Adel Rahman. In 2018, he joined Dutch club Achilles '29.

Rahman returned to League1 Ontario in Canada in the summer of 2018, and made five appearances for ProStars that season. In the winter of 2018–19, he played indoor soccer in the Arena Premier League with Italy AC. In 2019, he made seven league appearances before leaving mid-season. In mid 2019, Rahman switched to North Mississauga SC, making five league appearances and two in the playoffs. In 2021, he joined 1812 FC Barrie.

International career
Rahman made his debut for the Pakistan national football team in a 2–1 friendly loss to Palestine on 16 November 2018.

Rahman was in the starting line up for Pakistan's 2022 FIFA World Cup qualifier play-off match against Cambodia.

Personal life
Rahman was born in Germany to Pakistani parents, and moved to Canada at a young age. He played youth soccer for Brampton Youth SC.

References

External links
 
 Niagara Purple Eagles profile
 

Living people
1996 births
Association football midfielders
Canadian soccer players
Pakistani footballers
Footballers from Hesse
Footballers from Frankfurt
Pakistani emigrants to Canada
Naturalized citizens of Canada
Canadian expatriate soccer players
Pakistani expatriate footballers
Expatriate footballers in Slovakia
Pakistani expatriate sportspeople in Slovakia
Expatriate footballers in the Netherlands
Pakistani expatriate sportspeople in the Netherlands
Niagara Purple Eagles men's soccer players
KFC Komárno players
Achilles '29 players
League1 Ontario players
2. Liga (Slovakia) players
Tweede Divisie players
Pakistan international footballers
1812 FC Barrie players
North Mississauga SC players
Soccer players from Brampton
ProStars FC players
Blue Devils FC players